All India Democratic Women's Association (AIDWA) is a women's organisation committed to achieving democracy, equality and women's emancipation. It has an organizational presence in 23 states in India, with a current membership of more than 11 million. About two-thirds of the organisation's strength is derived from poor rural and urban women. It was founded in 1981 as a national level mass organisation of women. It is also the women's wing of the Communist Party of India (Marxist).

History and scope
Pappa Umanath founded the Democratic Women's Association in Tamil Nadu in 1973, working for women's rights and for their education, employment and status, along with issues like casteism, communalism, child rights and disaster aid. Several other affiliated State-based organisations developed, and the unified All India Democratic Women's Association (AIDWA) was established in 1981.

AIDWA has an annual membership fee of one rupee, which allows it policy-independence from donor agencies and government. In 2007, it had over 10 million members, spread across 23 states.

2002 campaign against Hindustan Lever advertising
Subtle cultural norms can be easily transgressed. In 2002, widespread protests forced Hindustan Unilever Limited (the Indian subsidiary of London-based Unilever) to cancel a television ad campaign for its fairness cream because of its portrayal of women. The campaign was built around the theme of a father lamenting "If only I had a son" while showing his problem: a dark-skinned, unattractive daughter. She uses the Fair & Lovely cream and has become a gorgeous light-skinned beauty. Clad in a stylish miniskirt, she is a successful airline flight attendant and takes her father to dine at a five-star hotel. AIDWA lodged a complaint with the National Human Rights Commission in New Delhi. It argued endorsing the traditional preference for sons strengthens gender discrimination, which is a major problem in India. Furthermore, said AIDWA, the ad perpetuated a culture of discrimination in a society where "fair skin" is synonymous with "beautiful." The government's Ministry of Information and Broadcast sided with AIDWA and directed stations not to air the ads because they violated the Cable and Television Networks Act of 1995 which states that no advertisement shall be permitted which "derides any race, caste, color, creed and nationality" and furthermore states that, "Women must not be portrayed in a manner that emphasizes passive, submissive qualities and encourages them to play a subordinate secondary role in the family and society." The minister told Parliament that if broadcasters do not regulate ad content the government will be forced to do so. The Mumbai-based Advertising Standards Council of India (ASCI), a body of advertisers and media agencies, insisted that it should do the regulating not the government. ASCI had already told Hindustan Lever that its ad campaign was offensive and it was ended.

National Conference of AIDWA
The first National Conference of AIDWA was held at Chennai in 1981, with delegates from 12 states representing 590,000 members. The eighth National Conference was held at Kolkata in 2007, with 951 delegates from 23 states, representing a membership of around 18,600,000. Former West Bengal Chief Minister Jyoti Basu addressed the inaugural session. The 9th National Conference of AIDWA, held at Moti Jheel, Kanpur from 9 to 12 November 2010, was the first conference to be held in the Northern Hindi belt. 753 delegates from 22 states and 20 special invitees took part in the four-day conference. Amidst slogans pledging to carry forward the struggle for women's equality and emancipation, legendary freedom fighter Capt. Lakshmi Sehgal, living symbol of women's fight against imperialism and emancipation, unfurled the AIDWA flag. Floral tributes were paid to martyrs who have laid down their lives in the struggle for equality, democracy and emancipation.

10th National Conference
AIDWA's 10th National Conference was held in Bodh Gaya, Bihar, from 22 to 25 November 2013. It started with flag hoisting by AIDWA's national president Shyamali Gupta and homage to martyrs who sacrificed their lives for women's emancipation and social justice. The inaugural session featured a special session titled "Women against Violence: Fighting for Justice, Resisting Violence, Claiming Rights", wherein women from across the country who have been fighting the battle against violence, discrimination and social injustice in various forms which includes domestic and political violence, sexual assault, fight for land rights, fight against caste and communal discrimination and against terrorism spoke. The women who spoke included representative of the Vachathi tribal mass rape survivor from Tamil Nadu, Parandhayi, who stood up against her sexual assault by forest and police officials for 19 years and finally succeeded in getting justice.

Office bearers
 President– P.K. Shreemathy
 General Secretary– Mariam Dhawale
 Treasurer- S. Punyawathi

See also
 Krantikari Adivasi Mahila Sangathan
 Mahila Atma Raksha Samiti
 National Federation of Indian Women

References

External links

  
 Brinda Karat Interview on AIDWA issues

Further reading
 
 

Women's rights organizations
Organizations established in 1981
Women's wings of political parties in India
Communist Party of India (Marxist)
Women's wings of communist parties